In Greek mythology, the name Euryte  (Ancient Greek: Εὐρύτη means "width") may refer to following women:

 Euryte, the nymph mother of Halirrhothius by Poseidon. She may be the same with Bathycleia, another name for the mother of Halirrhothius.
 Euryte, daughter of Hippodamas and granddaughter of Achelous. By King Porthaon of Calydon, she was the mother of Oeneus, Agrius, Leucopeus, Melas, Alcathous and Sterope.

Notes

References 

 Apollodorus, The Library with an English Translation by Sir James George Frazer, F.B.A., F.R.S. in 2 Volumes, Cambridge, MA, Harvard University Press; London, William Heinemann Ltd. 1921. ISBN 0-674-99135-4. Online version at the Perseus Digital Library. Greek text available from the same website.

Nymphs
Queens in Greek mythology
Aetolian characters in Greek mythology